Zhang Peiyuan (traditional Chinese: 張培元) ( – 1 June 1934) was a Han chinese general, commander of the Ili garrison. He fought against Uighur and Tungans during the Kumul revolt, but then secretly negotiated with the Tungan general Ma Zhongying to form an alliance against Sheng Shicai and the Soviet Union. Zhang's army had about 3,000 soldiers. They almost destroyed Sheng's armies but then the Soviet Union invaded Xinjiang and overran Zhang's forces. Zhang committed suicide to avoid capture by the Soviets at the Muzart Pass during a snow storm.

References

Republic of China warlords from Qinghai
Han Chinese people
National Revolutionary Army generals from Qinghai
1934 deaths
Suicides in the Republic of China
Year of birth missing
People from Hainan Prefecture
Suicides by firearm in China